Erza may refer to:

People
 Erza, or Erzya, a subgroup of the indigenous Mordvins of Russia
 Erza Native Religion, Mordvin native religion

Given name
 Erza Muqoli, French singer

Surname
 Berthe Erza, French-Algerian singer

Fiction
 Erza Scarlet, a character in the manga and anime series Fairy Tail
 Queen Erza, a character from the animated film Muzzy in Gondoland and its sequel Muzzy Comes Back

Places
 Erza McKenzie Round Barn, Buchanan County, Iowa, U.S.

See also
 Ersa (disambiguation)
 Erzya (disambiguation)
 Ezra (disambiguation)
 Ursa (disambiguation)
 Urza, a character in Magic: the Gathering